Worldes Blysse is the second album by British vocal group Mediæval Bæbes, released 19 October 1998.

Track listing

 Kinderly
 All Turns to Yesterday
 Love Me Broughte
 Beatrice
 Ecci Mundi Gaudium
 Waylaway
 Alba
 When Thy Turuf Is Thy Tour
 Erthe Upon Erthe
 Passing Thus Alone
 La Volta
 Pearl
 Swete Sone
 So Spricht das Leben
 C'est la fin
 How Death Comes

References

Mediæval Bæbes albums
1999 albums
Albums with cover art by Dave McKean